Robert Sutton de Clonard (or Closnard; 11 August 1751 in Wexford, Ireland — 1788, Vanikoro) was a French naval officer of Irish descent, notable for his role in the War of American Independence and in the Lapérouse expedition.

Familial background 
Chevalier Robert Sutton de Clonard was born to Thomas Sutton de Clonard, an officer in the French East India Company, and to Phyllis Masterson, from Castletown. Thomas Sutton de Clonard travelled several times to India on business.

Several members of the family served in the Navy, notably Robert's uncle Lieutenant Thomas de Clonard, and Robert's younger brother, who was killed on 15 December 1778 during the Battle of St. Lucia while serving on Languedoc.

Biography 
Robert Sutton de Clonard started sailing in 1768, serving on the East Indiamen Laverdy and Duc-de-Praslin.

In 1774, as Lapérouse defended besieged Mahé on Seine, Clonard was in command of a one-gun boat, which he used to attack shore positions, sustaining a light wound in the action.

On 16 March 1775, Clonard successfully defended a small fort. As Louis XVI awarded him a 300-pound pension for his conduct, he requested that the Order of Saint Louis be granted instead as he was "more sensitive to honour than to pecuniary graces".

Promoted to Lieutenant, he served on Glorieux under Captain vicomte d'Escars in the War of American Independence, taking part in the Invasion of Tobago on 30 May 1781. Captured by the British, he was exchanged and given command of the privateer Comte d'Artois, a large East Indiaman converted to a privateer, capturing several British merchantmen but encountering several warships on his second journey.

The British warships had been looking for Comte d'Artois and an engagement ensued in which Sutton was eventually forced to strike his colours. Clonard himself was slightly wounded. Of his crew, 21 men were killed and 35 wounded; Clonard himself was slightly wounded. Bienfaisant had three men killed and 20 wounded. Charon only joined the action towards the end of the engagement and only had a single man wounded. Two British frigates, Licorne and  also came up towards the end of the action and so shared in the prize money with Bienfaisant and Charon.

Clonard was released after his capture and on 12 September took command of Diligente on the orders of comte de Grasse.

In 1782, Diligente was lost, and Clonard was cited for his "prudence (...) courage and (...) strength of character". In the nect seven years, he served as first lieutenant in charge of intendance, sailed to Riga to procure wood, and served in India and American in combat operations.

By 1785, Clonard had served in eight campaigns, including three as commanding officer. He was tasked with commissioning  Boussole for her scientific campaign under Lapérouse.

From 29 April, Clonard was appointed to  Boussole. He initially served as the administrative officer.

On 1 January 1787 Clonard was promoted to the rank of capitaine de vaisseau. However, from November 1786 on he had been the recipient of a supplement of 120 livres as a flag captain.

On 12 December 1787 Clonard transferred to Astrolabe.

Disappearance
La Perouse's expedition vanished mysteriously in 1788 after leaving Botany Bay on 10 March 1788. In 1827 Captain Peter Dillon eventually discovered the fate of the expedition when he found remnants of Astrolable and Boussole at Vanikoro Island in the Solomon Islands.  The ships had been wrecked in a storm.

Survivors from one ship had been massacred while survivors from the other ship had constructed their own small boat and sailed off the island, never to be heard from again.

Citations and references
Citations

References
 Famille Sutton de Clonard, geneawiki.com
 Le testament mystique de Robert Sutton, chevalier de Clonard, archives-finistere.fr 
Bateson, Charles (1972) Australian Shipwrecks - vol1 1622-1850. (Sydney: AH and AW Reed).  
 
  London: Hakluyt Society, 2nd series, no. 179-180)

Author: 	Jean-François de Galaup La Pérouse, comte de; John Dunmore
Publisher: 	London : Hakluyt Society, 1994-1995.
Series: 	Works issued by the

1788 deaths
1751 births